The 1989 NCAA Division I Men's Soccer Tournament was the 30th organized men's college soccer tournament by the National Collegiate Athletic Association, to determine the top college soccer team in the United States. The final match was played on December 3, 1989, in Piscataway, New Jersey, at Rutgers Stadium. All the other games were played at the home field of the higher seeded team.

The Virginia Cavaliers and the Santa Clara Broncos were declared co-national champions after the championship game ended in a 1–1 tie.
Both teams won their first national titles. This tournament marks the third and final time the NCAA recognized men's soccer co-champions; the 1967 final was called due to weather, while the 1968 final was also a draw by rule.

Early rounds

Final 
The final was played in frigid conditions; the wind chill was ten degrees below zero at kickoff and dropped throughout the game, with the stiff breeze taking control of almost any ball kicked in the air. After the marathon 1985 final, which was played with unlimited 10-minute overtimes and required eight of them, the NCAA changed their rules to limit games to one 30-minute overtime and one 30-minute sudden-death period, each with two halves. Although all other tournament games could be decided by penalty kicks, this did not extend to the final. After the 150 minutes were played out, Virginia and Santa Clara were declared co-champions.

See also  
 NCAA Division II Men's Soccer Championship
 NCAA Division III Men's Soccer Championship
 NAIA Men's Soccer Championship

References 

NCAA Division I Men's Soccer Tournament seasons
NCAA Division I Men's
NCAA Division I Mens Soccer
NCAA Division I Men's Soccer Tournament